Hymenothrix palmeri is a North American species of flowering plant in the daisy family. It has been found only in the state of Chihuahua in northern Mexico.

Leaves are divided, with long narrow lobes. Each head has numerous yellow disc flowers but no ray flowers.

References

Bahieae
Endemic flora of Mexico
Flora of Chihuahua (state)
Plants described in 1886
Taxa named by Asa Gray